Philip Leon "Phil" Wise (born September 5, 1946) is a former ten-term Iowa State Representative. He served in the Iowa House of Representatives from 1987 through 2009 and did not seek re-election in 2008. He received his BS and MS from Northwest Missouri State University.

During his last term in the Iowa House, Wise served on the Commerce, Economic Growth, Education, and Ways and Means committees and served as Vice Chair of the Administrative Rules Review Committee. His political experience includes serving as Chair of the Lee County Democratic Party and serving as Assistant Minority Leader in the Iowa House during the 75th General Assembly.

Electoral history
*incumbent

References

External links

 
 Wise on Project Vote Smart
 Wise's Capitol Web Address

Democratic Party members of the Iowa House of Representatives
1946 births
Living people
Northwest Missouri State University alumni
People from Maryville, Missouri
People from Lee County, Iowa